James Zacharie Spearing (April 23, 1864 – November 2, 1942) was a U.S. Representative from Louisiana's 2nd congressional district, based in New Orleans.

Born in Alto in Cherokee County, Texas, Spearing moved with his parents in 1866 to New Orleans, where he attended public schools. He left school and went to work in 1877. In 1886, he obtained a degree from  Tulane University School of Law in New Orleans. That same year, he was admitted to the bar and began his legal practice in New Orleans.

He served as member of the Orleans Parish School Board from 1908 to 1912 and again from 1916 to 1920 and as president in 1919 and 1920. Between the parish school board terms, he was a member of the Louisiana State Board of Education from 1912 to 1916. He was an alternate delegate to the 1912 Democratic National Convention, which nominated the Wilson-Marshall ticket, which handily won the electoral votes of Louisiana.

Spearing was elected to the Sixty-eighth Congress to fill the vacancy caused by the death of H. Garland Dupré. He was reelected to the Sixty-ninth, Seventieth, and Seventy-first Congresses and served from April 22, 1924, to March 3, 1931. He was an unsuccessful candidate for renomination in 1930. Thereafter, he resumed the practice of law in New Orleans, where he died and is interred at Metairie Cemetery in New Orleans.

References

External links 
 

1864 births
1942 deaths
People from Cherokee County, Texas
Politicians from New Orleans
Tulane University Law School alumni
School board members in Louisiana
Democratic Party members of the United States House of Representatives from Louisiana
Lawyers from New Orleans
Burials at Metairie Cemetery